Jack McKenna (14 April 1889 – 4 December 1973) was a British long-distance runner. He competed in the marathon at the 1924 Summer Olympics.

References

External links
 

1889 births
1973 deaths
Athletes (track and field) at the 1924 Summer Olympics
British male long-distance runners
British male marathon runners
Olympic athletes of Great Britain
Sportspeople from Birmingham, West Midlands